Shanthakumaran Nair Sreesanth (born 6 February 1983) is an Indian former cricketer and film actor who played all forms of the game. He is a right-arm fast-medium-pace bowler and a right-handed tail-ender batsman. In first class cricket, he played for Kerala. In the Indian Premier League (IPL) he played for the Rajasthan Royals. He is also the first Kerala Ranji player to have played Twenty20 cricket for India. Initially banned for life after spot-fixing in the 2013 IPL, the ban was reduced to seven years in August 2019.
In 2018, he participated in the popular reality show, Bigg Boss and became the runner up. In 2020 he was selected for the Kerala cricket team and resumed his career in national cricket. In March 2022, Sreesanth announced his retirement from domestic cricket.

Personal life
Sreesanth was born on 6 February 1983 to Nair Santhakumaran and Savithri Devi. He has one elder brother and two elder sisters. His brother Dipu Santhan owns a music company in Kochi and his eldest sister Nivedita is a television actress in Kerala. Sreesanth's elder sister Divya married Madhu Balakrishnan, a famous South Indian playback singer.

On 12 December 2013, Sreesanth married his girlfriend Bhuvneshwari Kumari of Jaipur's Shekhawat family at Guruvayur Sri Krishna temple in Kerala. Bhuvneshwari Kumari aka Nain Shekhawat is the daughter of Hirendra Singh Shekhawat and Muktha Singh.

Early years
Sreesanth initially was a leg-spinner in his childhood, modelling his action on India's leading Test wicket-taker Anil Kumble, who was to become his Test captain. However, his habit of bowling yorkers led him to convert to fast bowling, after being encouraged by his elder brother. Following in the footsteps of fellow Kerala fast bowler Tinu Yohannan, who earned selection to the National Cricket Academy in 2000, Sreesanth was selected for the MRF Pace Foundation in Chennai. He then made his first-class debut against Goa in the 2002–03 domestic season, claiming 22 wickets in seven matches in the Ranji Trophy and winning selection for South Zone in the Duleep Trophy squad in the same season.

He was selected for India-A side in a tour match against the visiting New Zealand side at Rajkot. He claimed one wicket in twelve overs after being restricted with a hamstring injury. He also missed five Ranji Trophy games in that season, although he still travelled with the side for away games. This led to rumours that an astrologer convinced him to take a break from competition to preserve his longevity in the sport, which Sreesanth categorically denied, maintaining that he was training only to regain his fitness.

In November 2004, Sreesanth entered the record books when he took a hat-trick against Himachal Pradesh in a Ranji trophy game. He was selected to represent India B in the Challenger Trophy in October 2005, a domestic limited-overs tournament. He performed impressively in that tournament, earning the Man of the Series award and being the leading wicket taker (7) with the third best bowling average. This led to his selection to Indian team for the home ODI series against Sri Lanka.

ODI career
Sreesanth was given the new ball in the first ODI against Sri Lanka in Nagpur. After being punished early by Kumar Sangakkara and Sanath Jayasuriya, Sreesanth returned to claim his first two ODI wickets at the end of the match. He was left out of the team and was later recalled for the fourth, fifth and sixth ODIs as coach Greg Chappell tinkered with the line-up. He was retained in the squad but did not play in the 5 match series against South Africa, but played all five matches in the tour to Pakistan, recording a haul of 4/58 in the fifth ODI against Pakistani cricket team in Karachi. A good home series against the England in April 2006, in which he claimed 10 wickets at an average of 16.3, including a career best 6/55 in the final match at Indore (in which he was awarded the man of the match award ), led to him subsequently being awarded a BCCI contract, in the C-grade in May.

His disappointing economy rate led him to be left out of the ICC Champions Trophy squad of 14, with the beneficiary being R. P. Singh. He made an unexpected come back to the blue squad due to the injury to Ajit Agarkar later in the tournament. He was also out of the Indian ODI team for the England tour.

In the 2011 Cricket World Cup, Sreesanth was selected due to injury to Praveen Kumar. He was expensive in the first game going wicketless at 53 runs in 5 overs. He was selected in the final where he gave away 52 runs in 8 wicketless overs.

Test career

Sreesanth was selected for his first Test squad in the home series against England in March 2006, in place of Zaheer Khan. He claimed 4/95 in his debut appearance in the 1st Test in Nagpur, where he opened the bowling with Irfan Pathan. He was ruled out of the second Test in Mohali due to illness, but recovered and captured five wickets as well a 29* with the bat in the Third Test in Mumbai. With the axing of Pathan, Sreesanth became India's leading pace bowler on the tour of the West Indies. He missed the second Test due to an injury but managed to claim his best match figures of 5/72 in the 4th Test in Kingston, Jamaica.

Sreesanth's most significant performance to date in Test cricket was his role in the first Test of India's 2006 tour to South Africa at Johannesburg. After losing the limited-overs series 4–0, Sreesanth produced took 5–40 in a display of pace and swing to help dismiss South Africa. This performance helped to bowl South Africans out for just 84, leading to first Indian win on South African soil, for which he was named man of the match. Again, Sreesanth's emotional antics, which have led him to be regarded by some commentators as eccentric, were frequently noted. He was fined after breaching the International Cricket Council's advertising logo policy, and also for "conduct contrary to the spirit of the game" after sending off Hashim Amla after dismissing him. He was also involved in a highly publicised confrontation while batting against paceman André Nel. Nel delivered a series of fast balls at Sreesanth's upper body and after Sreesanth ungainly evaded one delivery, taunted him by gesturing to his chest, indicating that he felt Sreesanth was lacking in courage. On the next ball, Sreesanth gave him the charge and hit the ball straight over the bowler's head into the stands for a six. He then whirled his bat in enthusiasm and danced down the wicket, making fun of Nel and performing a dance. Later, Sreesanth said that he would not repeat anything of the sort, since he could be suspended for violating the code of conduct. Even though he went unpunished for the Nel incident, he was fined 30% of the match fee for running towards Hashim Amla after picking up his wicket, and wearing a branded garment under the jersey.

Sreesanth courted controversy once again during the fourth day of the second test of India's 2007 tour to England at Trent Bridge. He was fined half of his match fee for deliberately shoulder barging England captain Michael Vaughan whilst walking back to his mark. He also bowled a beamer at batsman Kevin Pietersen, which the latter had to take drastic action to avoid. Sreesanth however did immediately apologise afterwards. After the match he said that the ball had slipped from his hand. Former England captain Michael Atherton called for Sreesanth to be banned for the Pietersen beamer, saying that Sreesanth could not control his on-pitch emotions.

After leaving out of the Indian team for about a year and half, Sreesanth was called back to play the home Test series against Sri Lanka in November 2009. Sreesanth played the second Test in Kanpur and picked up five wickets in the first innings, which helped India win the match by an innings and 144 runs. Sreesath was awarded the Man of the Match for taking six wickets in the match. After the match, Indian captain Mahendra Singh Dhoni praised him as one of the best bowlers of reverse swing.

2007 cricket world cup 
In September 2007, Sreesanth joined the Indian team in South Africa for the inaugural ICC T-20 world cup following his omission for the one-day series in England. Although his performance in the tournament lacked consistency, Sreesanth managed breakthroughs at critical junctures that were vital to his team's success. During the semifinal match against Australia which India won, Sreesanth got the vital wickets of the Australian openers Adam Gilchrist and Matthew Hayden. The latter proved to be decisive in turning the match round in India's favour. His spell of 2-12 was named as the third-best T20I bowling performance of the year by ESPN-Cricinfo voters. In the final against rival Pakistan, he was little bit expensive. In thrilling match, in the final over he took catch, while standing on fine leg.

English county cricket  

In August 2009, Sreesanth signed a deal to play for Warwickshire for the remainder of the English season.

Indian Premier League
Sreesanth associated with the Rajasthan Royals in the Indian Premier League. In the inaugural edition of the IPL in 2008, Sreesanth became the second leading wicket taker in the tournament after Sohail Tanveer, claiming 18 wickets. Sreesanth appeared only in the second half of the 2009 edition of the IPL. He could not play the initial matches of the season owing to a stress fracture. He left Kings XI Punjab after the 2010 Indian Premier League and signed for Kochi for the 2011 competition. He signed for Rajasthan royals for the 2012 competition. But he didn't play in 2012 due to injuries. With his spot-fixing controversy coming into light during the 2013 IPL competition, Rajasthan Royals terminated his contract.

Altercation with Harbhajan Singh
On 25 April 2008, following the victory of his Kings XI Punjab's victory in the Indian Premier League over the Mumbai Indians at Mohali, Sreesanth was slapped under his eye by Harbhajan Singh, the captain of Mumbai. The incident came to light as Sreesanth was caught by TV cameras sobbing inconsolably on the field before the presentation ceremony. Sreesanth later downplayed the incident saying he had no complaints against Harbhajan who was "like an elder brother" to him. Harbhajan's team had lost their third consecutive match when he apparently reacted violently to Sreesanth's approaching him and saying "hard luck". The IPL banned Harbhajan from the remainder of the tournament and prohibited him from collecting his salary after finding him guilty. The BCCI launched a separate investigation into the incident and decided to ban Harbhajan for five ODIs, deeming him to have broken the code of conduct in his national contract.
In Australia earlier that year, Sreesanth stated that he would maintain an aggressive attitude on the cricket field, "Sreesanth's way is to be aggressive. Sreesanth will always remain Sreesanth."

Spot fixing allegation and arrest

On 16 May 2013, the Delhi police arrested Sreesanth and two of his Rajasthan Royals teammates, Ajit Chandila and Ankeet Chavan from Mumbai, on charges of spot-fixing during IPL 6. Jiju Janardhan, another key figure accused of spot-fixing, is reported to be Sreesanth's cousin and an under-22 Gujarat player. On 17 May 2013, Sreesanth confessed to spot-fixing, according to police. However, Sreesanth has always maintained that he is innocent and that he was forced to sign confession statements.

Police reported that Sreesanth was drunk at the time of his arrest and thought he was being arrested for being drunk. When the Delhi police team intercepted him, he was reportedly accompanied with a woman in a SUV outside a five-star hotel in Carter Road Promenade, Mumbai.

Sreesanth, and the two other players accused of spot fixing had their Rajasthan Royals contracts suspended while their inquiries were pending. On 13 September 2013, Sreesanth and Ankeet Chavan were banned for life by BCCI's disciplinary committee.

In July 2015, he was acquitted in the spot-fixing case.

On 18 October 2017, Kerala High Court restored the life ban on Sreesanth.

In March 2019, the Supreme Court of India "set aside" the life ban imposed on him by the BCCI. The apex court of the country asked the BCCI to "reconsider" and "revisit" the length of any fresh ban. Following which the BCCI reduced his ban to 7 years, which meant that he could play all forms of the game from 13 September 2020.

Comeback after ban 
Since the life ban imposed on him, it had been reduced to a seven-years ban, Sreesanth had talked about doing "everything possible to get back on the field". The ban officially ended on 13 September 2020. Sreesanth was selected in the Kerala Team for the Syed Mushtaq Ali Trophy and Vijay Hazare Trophy in 2021. He played the first match after his ban in the Syed Mushtaq Ali Trophy in January 2021. On 9 March 2022, Sreesanth announced his retirement from domestic cricket.

Incidents 
Sreesanth is noted for his exuberant and emotional behaviour, especially whilst appealing for and celebrating wickets. He has been warned several times for indiscipline both on and off the cricket field, and frequently fined for violating the player conduct guidelines of the International Cricket Council. In October 2009, the BCCI issued a final warning to Sreesanth that any repetition of his code of conduct violations might result in drastic actions such as a ban from domestic cricket. Subsequently, the Kerala Cricket Association also issued a final warning over repeated violations of their code of conduct after Sreesanth failed to turn up at the Kerala Ranji Trophy team camp in Kannur.

In November 2009, however, after more than 18 months of omission from the national team, Sreesanth was recalled to the Test squad for the first two matches against Sri Lanka. He replaced Ishant Sharma for the second Test in Kanpur, where his five wicket haul in the first innings of the match earned him the Man of the Match award and helped India to win the Test match by an innings and 144 runs.

Name

Correct name
In the English-language media, Sreesanth's full name has been the source of some confusion. He has been variously referred to as "Sree Sreesanth", "Sri Sreesanth", "Shantha Sreesanth". and "Shanthakumaran Sreesanth". He has also stated in the past that he wished to be known as "Sree Santh".
In September 2007, Sreesanth said that his name was just "Sreesanth" and that the other variations were incorrect:
"It's Sreesanth. There is no Shanthakumaran Sreesanth, there is no S. Sreesanth. There was this function recently where they called me Sree Sreesanth, then Sree, and finally S Sreesanth. It's just Sreesanth."

Decision and cancellation of name change
When his form slumped in 2006, Sreesanth had tried to change his luck by changing his name to Sreesunth, on numerological advice. He later stated that he was not going to change the name due to sentimental reasons. The word 'santh' in his name is derived from his father's name Santhakumaran Nair.

Film career

Television career
In 2008, he participated in the reality show Ek Khiladi Ek Haseena along with Surveen Chawla.

In 2014, Sreesanth participated in the dance reality show Jhalak Dikhhla Jaa in its seventh season. He survived for 5 weeks until he got eliminated.

In 2018, Sreesanth participated as a celebrity contestant in the twelfth season of Bigg Boss, the Indian version of the reality TV show Big Brother, where he finished as the runner up of the show. His stay in the house was highly controversial and he ended up as the most controversial contestant of the season and one of the most controversial contestants of the show in general. While he formed close friendships with fellow housemates including season winner Dipika Kakar and Shivashish Mishra, he frequently engaged in ugly fights with most of the other housemates and even guests including Season 11 contestant Vikas Gupta and threatened to leave the house 299 times. His performance in tasks was questioned as well. However, none of these diminished his popularity and he was praised by a large number of supporters, celebrities, former contestants and even fellow housemates for his innocent nature and straightforward attitude. Sreesanth also relived many events of his cricket career in the show, including the slapgate and spot-fixing incidents.

Television

Political career
On 25 March 2016, Sreesanth joined the Bharatiya Janata Party (BJP). He contested and lost the Kerala Assembly elections from Thiruvananthapuram. He secured a total of 34,764 votes but lost the election to VS Sivakumar of the Congress by 11,710 votes.

References

External links

 
 

1983 births
Living people
Malayali people
Cricketers from Kochi
People from Ernakulam district
Indian cricketers
India Test cricketers
India One Day International cricketers
India Twenty20 International cricketers
Kerala cricketers
South Zone cricketers
Warwickshire cricketers
Punjab Kings cricketers
Kochi Tuskers Kerala cricketers
Rajasthan Royals cricketers
India Red cricketers
India Blue cricketers
Cricketers at the 2007 Cricket World Cup
Cricketers at the 2011 Cricket World Cup
Indian prisoners and detainees
Cricketers who have acted in films
Cricketers banned for corruption
Bigg Boss (Hindi TV series) contestants
Fear Factor: Khatron Ke Khiladi participants
Indian Premier League